Claude Mongeau is a Canadian railroad executive who served as the president and chief executive officer of Canadian National Railway (CNR) from January 1, 2010, to July 1, 2016. He succeeded Hunter Harrison. During his tenure as president of CN, he "tried to improve ... frayed relations with the railway's customers and partners through a series of service agreements."

Born in Montreal, Quebec, Mongeau began his railroad career when he joined CN in 1994. 
He held the positions of vice-president of strategic and financial planning, and assistant vice-president of corporate development. He was appointed executive vice-president and chief financial officer in October 2000.

Before joining CN, Mongeau was a partner with Groupe Secor, a Montreal-based management consulting firm providing strategic advice to large Canadian corporations such as Bombardier and Bell Canada. He also worked in the business development unit of Imasco Inc., a diversified holding company with subsidiaries operating in the manufacturing, retail, and financial services sectors. His career started in Europe with Bain & Company, a leading American consulting firm.

In 1997, Mongeau was named one of Canada's top 40 executives under 40 years of age by the Financial Post Magazine. In 2005, he was selected Canada's CFO of the Year by an independent committee of prominent Canadian business leaders.

On April 26 2017 CN announced that the training centre would be named after Mongeau.

Accomplishments
Directorships:
 Norfolk Southern Corporation (current, a director during East Palestine, OH tragedy)
 Cenovus Energy
 Toronto-Dominion Bank
 Telus Communications (2017-2019)
 Canadian National Railway Company (2009-2016)
 Nortel Networks Corporation (2006-2009)
 SNC-Lavalin Group (2003-2015)
 Railway Association of Canada
 The Canadian Council of Chief Executives

Education:

 McGill University Desautels Faculty of Management
 Institut Supérieur des affaires (France)
 University of Quebec in Montreal

Professional experience:

 Canadian National Railway Company
 Imasco Ltd
 Groupe Secor Inc.
 Bain & Company (Paris)
 
Awards:

 Canada's CFO of the Year for 2005
 Canada's Top 40 under 40

References 

Living people
Canadian National Railway executives
Canadian chief executives
Chief financial officers
McGill University Faculty of Management alumni
Businesspeople from Montreal
Year of birth missing (living people)